Elven C. Smith House is a historic home located at Williamson, Mingo County, West Virginia. It was built in 1938, in a Neo-Classical Revival / Georgian Revival style.  It is a red brick building with a hipped roof and features a two-story, flat roofed portico supported by fluted columns.  Also on the property is a stone retaining wall and monumental stairway in the landscaped gardens.

It was listed on the National Register of Historic Places in 2002.

References

Houses on the National Register of Historic Places in West Virginia
Neoclassical architecture in West Virginia
Houses completed in 1938
Houses in Mingo County, West Virginia
National Register of Historic Places in Mingo County, West Virginia
Georgian Revival architecture in West Virginia